Forrest Glen Robinson (born 1940) is an American literary historian. He is a professor of literature at the University of California at Santa Cruz and an author of books and articles on American literature especially of the American West and Mark Twain. He's the author of The Cambridge Companion to Mark Twain.

Career
In 1972, Robinson was a Guggenheim Fellow.

Work
His work on "bad faith" in Mark Twain's writing was criticized for its basis in sociology, Marxist thought, and deconstruction "aimed at unmasking the deceptions that authors".. "practice on a public."

Bibliography
In Bad Faith: Dynamics of Deception in Mark Twain's America. Cambridge, Mass.: Harvard University Press (1986). .
An Apology for Poetry (as editor). Indianapolis: Bobbs-Merrill (1970). Incl. introduction, notes.
The Shape of Things Known: Sidney's Apology in its Philosophical Tradition.
Love's Story Told: A Life of Henry A. Murray. Cambridge, Mass.: Harvard University Press (1992). .
See: Henry A. Murray.
The Author-Cat: Clemens Life in Fiction. New York: Fordham University Press (2007).
The New Western History: The Territory Ahead. Tucson: University of Arizona Press (1998).
Having it Both Ways: Self-subversion in Western Popular Classics. Albuquerque: University of New Mexico Press (1993). .
Wallace Stegner, with Margaret G. Robinson. Boston: Twayne Publishers (1977). .
 "Tom Exploits St. Petersburg's Hypocrisy." In: Readings on The Adventures of Tom Sawyer. New York: Greenhaven Press. pp. 77-85.

References

21st-century American historians
21st-century American non-fiction writers
20th-century American non-fiction writers
20th-century American historians
American male non-fiction writers
Mark Twain
University of California, Santa Cruz faculty
Historians from California
1940 births
Living people
21st-century American male writers
20th-century American male writers